Emamzadeh Mohammad (also Romanized as Emāmzādeh Moḩammad) is a village in Fedashkuyeh Rural District, Shibkaveh District, Fasa County, Fars Province, Iran. At the 2006 census, its population was 256, in 60 families.

References 

Populated places in Fasa County